Arecibo may refer to:

Places
Arecibo, Puerto Rico, USA; a municipality located by the Atlantic Ocean
Arecibo barrio-pueblo, Arecibo, USA; a borough and county seat of Arecibo municipality
Senatorial District of Arecibo, in the state senate of Puerto Rico
Roman Catholic Diocese of Arecibo, in Puerto Rico
Río Grande de Arecibo, Puerto Rico; a river
4337 Arecibo, an Outer Main-belt Asteroid discovered in 1985
Arecibo Vallis, a valley on Mercury

Facilities and structures
Arecibo Observatory, an astronomical radio observatory located approximately south-southwest from the city of Arecibo
Arecibo Telescope, a very sensitive radio telescope located at the observatory
Arecibo Planetary Radar, a radar astronomy station located at the radio telescope Arecibo Telescope
University of Puerto Rico at Arecibo (UPR-Arecibo), Arecibo, Puerto Rico, USA
Arecibo Light, Arecibo, Puerto Rico; a lighthouse

Other uses
Arecibo message, a message beamed into space via frequency modulated radio waves in 1974
Arecibo (EP), an extended play by English singer Little Boots
Arecibo Captains, a team in National Superior Basketball, the Puerto Rican basketball league

See also

 Arasibo (15th century), a Taino Amerind chief
 GALEX Arecibo SDSS Survey, an astronomical survey